Kepler-90, also designated 2MASS J18574403+4918185, is an F-type star located about  from Earth in the constellation of Draco. It is notable for possessing a planetary system that has the same number of observed planets as the Solar System.

On 14 December 2017, NASA and Google announced the discovery of an eighth exoplanet, Kepler-90i, in the Kepler-90 system. The discovery was made using a new machine learning method developed by Google.

Nomenclature and history
Prior to Kepler observation, Kepler-90 had the 2MASS catalogue number 2MASS J18574403+4918185. It has the designation of KIC 11442793 in the Kepler Input Catalog, and given the Kepler object of interest number of KOI-351 when it was found to have a transiting planet candidate.

The star's planetary system was discovered by NASA's Kepler Mission, a mission tasked with discovering planets in transit around their stars. The transit method that Kepler uses involves detecting dips in brightness in stars. These dips in brightness can be interpreted as planets whose orbits move in front of their stars from the perspective of Earth. The name Kepler-90 derives directly from the fact that the star is the catalogued 90th star discovered by Kepler to have confirmed planets.

The whole star and planet system is designated by just "Kepler-90", without a postfix, with Kepler-90A specifically referring only to the star, if needed for clarity. The first planet discovered is Kepler-90b, with subsequently discovered planets given subsequent lowercase letters in order of discovery, up to Kepler-90i, for the last planet found  to date.

Stellar characteristics
Kepler-90 is a F-type star that is approximately 120% the mass and radius of the Sun. It has a surface temperature of 6080 K, and an estimated age of around 2 billion years. In comparison, the Sun is about 4.6 billion years old and has a surface temperature of 5778 K.

The star's apparent magnitude, or how bright it appears from Earth's perspective, is 14. It is too dim to be seen with the naked eye, which typically can only see objects with a magnitude around 6 or less.

Planetary system

Kepler-90 is notable for similarity of the configuration of its planetary system to that of the Solar System, in which rocky planets are nearer the star and gas giants farther away. The six inner planets range from super-Earths to mini-Neptunes in size. The two outermost planets are gas giants. The most distant known planet orbits its host star at about the same distance as Earth from the Sun.

Kepler-90 was used to test the "validation by multiplicity" confirmation method for Kepler planets. Six inner planets met all the requirements for confirmation. The penultimate planet showed transit-timing variations, indicating that it is a real planet as well.

The Kepler-90 system is the only eight-planet candidate system from Kepler, and the second to be discovered after the Solar System. It was also the only seven-planet candidate system from Kepler before the eighth was discovered in 2017. All of the eight known planet candidates orbit within about 1 AU of Kepler-90. A Hill stability test and an orbital integration of the system show that it is stable.

The five innermost exoplanets, Kepler-90b, c, i, d, and e may be tidally locked, meaning that one side of the exoplanets permanently faces the star in eternal daylight and the other side permanently faces away in eternal darkness.

Several possible explanations for its apparently low density include a puffy planet with a dusty atmosphere or a smaller planet surrounded by a tilted wide ring system (albeit the latter option is less likely due to the lack of evidence for rings in transit data).

.

Near resonances
Kepler-90's eight known planets all have periods that are close to being in integer ratio relationships with other planets' periods; that is, they are close to being in orbital resonance. The period ratios b:c, c:i and i:d are close to 4:5, 3:5, and 1:4, respectively (4: 4.977, 3: 4.97, and 1: 4.13) and d, e, f, g, and h are close to a 2:3:4:7:11 period ratio (2: 3.078: 4.182: 7.051: 11.102; also 7: 11.021). f, g, and h are also close to a 3:5:8 period ratio (3: 5.058: 7.964).

Relevant to systems like this and that of Kepler-36, calculations suggest that the presence of an outer gas giant planet (as exemplified by g and h in this system) facilitates the formation of closely packed resonances among inner super-Earths. The semimajor axis of any additional nontransiting outer gas giant must be larger than 30 AU to keep from perturbing the observed planetary system out of the transiting plane.

See also
 Solar System – The only other planetary system with at least eight planets.
 TRAPPIST-1 – A star with seven known exoplanets.
 HD 10180 – A star with at least six known exoplanets, and three exoplanet candidates.
 HD 219134 – A star with six exoplanets.
 55 Cancri – Another star with multiple planets.
 Tau Ceti – A star with at least four exoplanets and four more candidates.

Footnotes

References

External links
 

Planetary transit variables
351
Planetary systems with eight confirmed planets
Draco (constellation)
F-type main-sequence stars
J18574403+4918185